Star is a small village in the parish and community of Clydau in Pembrokeshire, Wales.

It lies south of Bwlchygroes on a crossroads in the valley of the Afon Cneifa (a tributary of Afon Cych) where the river is bridged.

History
In 1910 there was a mill processing wheat and corn in the village, and a public house, the Lancych Arms, taking its name from the small settlement of Lancych on Afon Cych to the north.

Chapel
Star Baptist Chapel was opened in 1881. It has an external baptism tank. In 1892 the annual meeting of the Pembrokeshire Baptist Association was held in Star, with preaching to large numbers of people over two days.

References

External links 

Villages in Pembrokeshire